Pavel Filatov (1887 – 1956) was a Ukrainian fencer. He competed in the individual sabre event at the 1912 Summer Olympics.

References

1887 births
1956 deaths
Male fencers from the Russian Empire
Olympic competitors for the Russian Empire
Fencers at the 1912 Summer Olympics